The Plough is a 2023 French-Swiss drama film directed by Philippe Garrel. Starring Louis Garrel, Damien Mongin, Esther Garrel, Lena Garrel and Francine Bergé, it depicts the story of  romantic and tragic destiny of a family of puppeteer artists. It competed for the Golden Bear at the 73rd Berlin International Film Festival, where it had its world premiere on 21 February 2023. It is scheduled for release in French cinemas on March 8, 2023.

Synopsis
A traveling puppet theater is legacy of three siblings, father and grandmother. When the father dies during a performance, the remaining family members keep the show running and try to keep legacy alive.

Cast
 Louis Garrel as Louis
 Damien Mongin as Pieter
 Esther Garrel as Martha
 Lena Garrel as Lena
 Francine Bergé as grandmother
 Aurélien Recoing as father
 Mathilde Weil as Helene
 Asma Messaoudene as Laura

Production

Development
In director's statement Philippe Garrel said, "I wanted to make a film with my three children, since my children are aged 22, 30 and 38, I had to find a reason to bring them together at those ages." His father Maurice Garrel was a puppeteer in Gaston Baty’s troupe along with his godfather, Alain Recoing. So, he decided to depict a family of puppeteers and wrote the screenplay with Jean-Claude Carrière, Arlette Langmann and Caroline Deruas Peano. In March 2022, CNC released funds for the film.

Casting
Besides Louis Garrel, Esther Garrel, and Lena Garrel in the roles of the siblings Louis, Martha and Lena, Francine Bergé as the grandmother, 
Alain Recoing's son Aurélien Recoing as the father, Damien Mongin as Pieter, Mathilde Weil as Hélène and Asma Messaoudene as Laura were cast. Renato Berta shot the film in black and white and the scenery was created by Manu de Chauvigny. Jean-Louis Aubert, like Philippe Garrel's previous films composed the music of The Plough.

Release
The Plough had its world premiere on 21 February 2023 as part of the 73rd Berlin International Film Festival, in competition. It is scheduled to release in French cinemas on March 8, 2023.

Reception

On the review aggregator Rotten Tomatoes website, the film has an approval rating of 29% based on 7 reviews, with an average rating of 3.8/10.

Jordan Mintzer of The Hollywood Reporter calling the film "Intimately familiar" wrote, "A minor if somewhat memorable work by a director who has left his mark not only on his own children, but on a brand of filmmaking that may disappear along with him." Fabien Lemercier reviewing for Cineuropa praised the film and wrote, "It’s a perfect portrait beneath a modest surface, which pulls back the curtain on the universe of those pulling puppets’ strings in the world of fiction, folk who are more than familiar with the ups and downs of life." Jonathan Romney for ScreenDaily wrote in review that the film is "You’d have to be a committed Garrelian, or a hardline upholder of the prerogatives of French auteurism, to really appreciate a glum piece which feels like a relic of a European cinema that is no longer really attuned to the times."

Accolades

References

External links
 
 The Plough at Berlinale
 The Plough at Cineserie 
 

2023 films
French drama films
2020s French-language films
Films directed by Philippe Garrel
Swiss drama films
French-language Swiss films
2020s French films
Arte France Cinéma films
Puppet films